The Campfire Tour is a 2016 mini-tour by Bob Weir backed by members of the indie-rock band The National: Aaron Dessner, Bryan Devendorf, Scott Devendorf, and Josh Kaufman, in support of his third solo album Blue Mountain. The tour spanned nine shows and eight venues on the East and West coasts. The tour began on October 7, 2016, at the Marin County Civic Centre in San Rafael, California and wrapped up on October 20, 2016 at the Chicago Theatre in Chicago, IL. While Weir had enlisted Aaron Dessner of The National to be a part of his backing band for the jaunt, Dessner had pulled out due to a family emergency. Weir announced his longtime collaborator Steve Kimock has stepped up to join the backing band which also includes new addition Jon Shaw (Cass McCombs/Shakey Graves) on bass as well.

Weir and the band also promoted the tour and accompanying album with a performance of "Lay My Lily Down" on The Late Show with Stephen Colbert, on October 17, 2016.

Tour dates
The band performed a total of nine concerts in eight U.S. cities.

Musicians
Bob Weir - guitar, vocals
Steve Kimock - guitar, lap steel guitar
Jon Shaw - bass guitar, rhodes, vocals
Bryan Devendorf - drums
Scott Devendorf - bass guitar, guitar, vocals
Josh Kaufman - guitar, vocals, lap steel guitar

References

Bob Weir